Erwin Kohn (20 December 1911, in Baden – 18 March 1994, in Mar del Plata) was a male international table tennis player from Austria.

Table tennis career
Kohn was Austria's national table tennis champion by the age of 16. From 1932 to 1936 he won eight medals in singles, doubles, and team events in the World Table Tennis Championships.

The nine World Championship medals included a gold medal in the team event at the 1936 World Table Tennis Championships for Austria.

Personal life
He was of Jewish descent so fled to England in 1938 and then emigrated to Argentina.

See also
 List of table tennis players
 List of World Table Tennis Championships medalists

References

Austrian male table tennis players
Jewish table tennis players
Austrian Jews
Austrian emigrants to Argentina
1911 births
1994 deaths